Robin Patricia Williams (born October 9, 1953) is an American educator who has authored many computer-related books, as well as the book Sweet Swan of Avon: Did a Woman Write Shakespeare?. Among her computer books are manuals of style The Mac is Not a Typewriter and numerous manuals for various macOS operating systems and applications, including The Little Mac Book.

Biography
Williams was born in Berkeley, California. She grew up in San Jose and Fremont, California and graduated from Washington High School in Fremont. After high school, she worked in hospitals and then traveled to Europe for two years. She moved to Santa Rosa, California to attend a graphic design program at Santa Rosa Junior College, and began teaching graphic design at the college in 1981. In 2011, she received an MA degree from Brunel University, London, in Shakespeare Authorship studies, and in 2014 she completed a doctoral dissertation for the same university; her doctorate is on the history (and future) of reading Shakespeare—out loud and in community, with an emphasis on editorial practice.

Williams is a graphic designer, typographer, author, college instructor, and lecturer. She began writing in the 1980s, after teaching graphic design and a course about the Mac computer at a California community college. She has taught Shakespeare at Santa Fe Community College and leads the Shakespeare Close Readers reading and discussion groups about individual plays. She has been a leader in the New Mexico Internet Professionals Association and the Santa Fe Mac Users Group. She is a founder of the Mary Sidney Society and iReadShakespeare.

She has three children she raised as a single mother, including while working as a part-time instructor at Santa Rosa Junior College.

Writings 
She has written, designed, indexed, and produced more than seventy computer-related books, and by 2005, many of her books had been translated into twenty-three languages. Some of her early works include The Little Mac Book and The Mac is Not a Typewriter. By 2002, The Little Mac Book had published its eighth edition. By 2005, she had published 51 books about Mac computers.

Williams has spent years studying William Shakespeare, and in 2006 issued her book Sweet Swan of Avon: Did a Woman Write Shakespeare? in which she presented evidence in support of the theory that the writer Mary Sidney is the author of Shakespeare's work. Mary Sidney was first proposed as an authorship candidate as part of a group theory by Gilbert Slater in 1931.

Bibliography

Books 
Williams is creating a line of Shakespeare plays called the Readers' Editions, edited and designed specifically for reading aloud in a Shakespeare reading group, independently published as part of iReadShakespeare.org.

 Williams, Robin P. Sweet Swan of Avon: Did a Woman Write Shakespeare?. USA: Wilton Circle Press; 2006. 

Williams has written more than 70 books, published by  Peachpit Press, Berkeley, CA.

Titles by Williams, Robin (writing alone under that name, except as noted).
 The Non-Designer's Presentation Book 
 The Little Mac Book, Leopard Edition
 Mac OS X 10.5 Leopard: Peachpit Learning Series, Adobe ReaderDownload
 Mac OS X 10.5 Leopard: Peachpit Learning Series
 Non-Designer's Design and Type Books, Deluxe Edition, The
 Non-Designer's Collection, The
 Non-Designer's Type Book, The, 2nd Edition
 Little Mac Book, Tiger Edition, The
 Mac OS X 10.4 Tiger: Peachpit Learning Series
 The Little Mac Book, Panther Edition
 The Mac OS X Book, Panther Edition
 The Non-Designer's Design Book 
 Robin Williams Mac OS X Book, Jaguar Edition
 The Little Mac OS X Book
 The Little Mac Book, 6th Ed. 
 How to Boss Your Fonts Around 
 The Mac is Not a Typewriter, 2nd Ed.  
 The Little iMac Book, 2nd Ed. 
 The Little iBook 

Titles by Williams, Robin, writing with Tollett, John (and, as noted, others). 
  Robin Williams Cool Mac Apps: A guide to iLife 08, .Mac, and more	
 Robin Williams Design Workshop, Second Edition, Adobe Reader, 2nd EditionDownload
 Podcasting and Blogging with GarageBand and iWeb eBookDownload
 Podcasting and Blogging with GarageBand and iWeb
 Robin Williams Design Workshop, 2nd Edition
 Macs on the Go, Adobe ReaderDownload
 Macs on the Go
 Non-Designer's Web Book, The, 3rd Edition
 Robin Williams Cool Mac Apps, Second Edition: A guide to iLife 05, .Mac, and more, 2nd Edition
 Robin Williams Cool Mac Apps: A guide to iLife, Mac.com, and more
  Little Mac iApps Book, The
 Little iMac Book, The, 3rd Edition
 With both Tollett and Rohr, Dave. Robin Williams Web Design Workshop
 Robin Williams Design Workshop
 The Non-Designer's Web Book, 2nd Edition 
 A Blip in the Continuum

With Cohen, Sandee. 
 Non-Designer's Scan and Print Book, The

With Steve Cummings:
 Jargon, An Informal Dictionary of Computer Terms (1993: Peachpit Press)

With Dave Mark:
 Home Sweet Home Page

References

External links
 Books by Robin Williams at Peachpit Press
 Family website
 Mary Sidney site
 iReadShakespeare site

1953 births
Living people
20th-century American women writers
21st-century American women writers
Alumni of Brunel University London
Macintosh operating systems
Santa Rosa Junior College alumni
Shakespeare authorship theorists
Writers from Berkeley, California